The Russian Third League 1994 was the first time the competition of the fourth level of Russian football was professional. There were six zones with 105 teams starting the competition in total (8 of them were excluded before the end of the season).

Zone 1

Overview

Standings

Notes:
 FC Kolos-2 Krasnodar were excluded from the league after playing 25 games. The opponents were awarded a win in the remaining games. 
 FC Urartu Grozny renamed to FC Gigant Grozny. Gigant was excluded from the league after playing 18 games. The opponents were awarded a win in the remaining games. Gigant did not play in national competitions in 1995 due to First Chechen War.
 FC Druzhba Budyonnovsk was excluded from the league after playing 15 games. The opponents were awarded a win in the remaining games, except for the game against FC Gigant Grozny, in which both teams were awarded a loss. Druzhba did not play in national competitions in 1995.
 FC Khimik Belorechensk were excluded from the league after playing 14 games. All the results of their games were discarded. Khimik did not play in national competitions in 1995.
 FC Iriston Vladikavkaz were awarded 2 home wins.
 FC Niva Slavyansk-na-Kubani, FC Kuban Slavyansk-na-Kubani and FC Spartak Alagir were awarded 1 home win each.
 FC Argo Kaspiysk were awarded 1 home loss and 1 home win.
 FC Mashuk Pyatigorsk renamed to FC Energiya.
 FC Kuban Barannikovsky moved to Slavyansk-na-Kubani.
 FC Asmaral Kislovodsk renamed to FC Olimp.
 FC Kaspiy Kaspiysk renamed to FC Argo.
 FC Iriston Mozdok and FC Spartak Alagir promoted from the Amateur Football League.
 FC Dynamo-d Stavropol played their first professional season.
 FC Uralan-d Elista converted from FC Baysachnr Elista.
 FC Lokomotiv Mineralnye Vody did not play on the national level in 1993.

Top goalscorers 
22 goals

 Nikolay Komlichenko (FC Niva Slavyansk-na-Kubani)

21 goals

 Yevgeni Likhachyov (FC Avtozapchast Baksan)

17 goals

 Arif Romanov (FC Olimp Kislovodsk)

14 goals

 Oleg Alyoshin (FC Kuban Slavyansk-na-Kubani)
 Vladimir Grishchenko (FC Slavyansk Slavyansk-na-Kubani)
 Oleg Kozemov (FC Energiya Pyatigorsk)
 Abilfez Madanov (FC Energiya Pyatigorsk)

13 goals

 Aleksandr Durnev (FC Beshtau Lermontov)

12 goals

 Andrei Stepanov (FC Torpedo Armavir)

11 goals

 Giya Chokhonelidze (FC Kolos-2 Krasnodar)
 Aleksei Kozlov (FC Dynamo-d Stavropol)

Zone 2

Overview

Standings

Notes:
 FC Kristall Dyatkovo were promoted from the Amateur Football League. Kristall were excluded from the league after playing 24 games. The opponents were awarded a win in the remaining games. 
 FC Ingushetiya Nazran were awarded 9 home wins.
 FC Khimik Dankov were promoted from the Amateur Football League. They returned to that level after the season.
 FC Kolos Bykovo were promoted from the Amateur Football League. They did not participate in any national-level competitions in 1995.
 FC Ingushetiya Nazran and FC Spartak-Bratskiy Yuzhny played their first professional season.
 FC Avangard Kamyshin did not participate in any national-level competitions in 1995.

Top goalscorers 
23 goals

 Yevgeni Kuzka (FC Khimik Dankov)

18 goals

 Viktor Kontsevenko (FC Shakhtyor Shakhty)

17 goals

 Valeri Klimov (FC Oryol)

16 goals

 Konstantin Boyko (FC Istochnik Rostov-on-Don)

14 goals

 Yuri Sirota (FC Atommash Volgodonsk)

13 goals

 Andrei Anisimov (FC Volgar Astrakhan)

12 goals

 Mikhail Sukhorukov (FC Avangard Kursk)

11 goals

 Vitali Ivanov (FC Kolos Bykovo)

10 goals

  Yuri Aksenov (FC Rotor-d Volgograd)
 Sergei Dogunkov (FC Volgar Astrakhan)
 Kamil Ferkhanov (FC Turbostroitel Kaluga)
 Oleg Popov (FC Avangard Kamyshin)
 Otari Pruidze (FC Volgar Astrakhan)

Zone 3

Overview

Standings

Notes:

 FC Asmaral-d Moscow were excluded from the league after playing 33 games. The opponents were awarded a win in the remaining games. 
 FC Don Novomoskovsk and FC Dynamo-2 Moscow were awarded 1 home wins each.
 PFC CSKA-d Moscow, FC Kosmos Dolgoprudny and FC Oka Kolomna were awarded 1 home loss each.
 FC Spartak-d Moscow were not promoted to the Second League as they were the reserve team of FC Spartak Moscow and reserve teams were not eligible for promotion.
 FC Avtomobilist Noginsk, FC Rossiya Moscow and FC Mashinostroitel Sergiyev Posad promoted from the Amateur Football League.
 PFC CSKA-2 Moscow and FC Rekord Aleksandrov did not participate in any national-level competitions in 1995.
 FC Viktor-Gigant Voskresensk renamed to FC Gigant. FC Gigant did not participate in any national-level competitions in 1995.
 FC Kosmos-Kvest Dolgoprudny renamed to FC Kosmos.
 FC SUO Moscow renamed to FC Chertanovo.

Top goalscorers 
30 goals

  Andrey Movsisyan (FC Spartak-d Moscow)

28 goals

 Aleksandr Antonov (FC Spartak Shchyolkovo)

26 goals

 Rashid Gallakberov (FC Saturn Ramenskoye)

24 goals

 Aleksei Kutsenko (FC Dynamo-d Moscow)

23 goals

 Aleksandr Drozdov (FC Torgmash Lyubertsy)
 Andrey Tikhonov (FC Spartak-d Moscow)

22 goals

 Sergei Gavrilin (FC Kosmos Dolgoprudny)

21 goals

 Andrei Bulanov (FC Torpedo-MKB Mytishchi)
 Igor Reutov (FC Avtomobilist Noginsk)
 Igor Voronin (FC Mosenergo Moscow)

Zone 4

Overview

Standings

Notes:

 FC Vest Kaliningrad were excluded from the league after playing 11 games. All the results of their games were discarded. FC Vest did not play in any national-level competitions in 1995.
 FC Zenit-d St. Petersburg were excluded from the league after playing 10 games. All the results of their games were discarded. 
 FC Khimik Koryazhma promoted from the Amateur Football League. Khimik did not play in any national-level competitions in 1995.
 FC Baltika-d Kaliningrad played their first professional season. Baltika-d did not play in any national-level competitions in 1995.
 FC Neftyanik Yaroslavl and FC Metallurg Pikalyovo promoted from the Amateur Football League.

Top goalscorers 
24 goals

 Valeri Solyanik (FC Kristall Smolensk)

14 goals

 Vladimir Ivanov (FC Gatchina)

11 goals

 Sergei Rybakov (FC Gatchina)

10 goals

 Pavel Barankov (FC Kristall Smolensk)
 Aleksei Gudkov (FC Kristall Smolensk)
 Vladimir Vasilyev (FC Mashinostroitel Pskov)

8 goals

 Igor Aksyonov (FC Neftyanik Yaroslavl)
 Sergei Grabazdin (FC Volochanin Vyshny Volochyok)
 Maksim Olkhovik (FC Iskra Smolensk)
 Yuri Sokolov (FC Mashinostroitel Pskov)

Zone 5

Overview

Standings

Notes:
 FC Astrateks Astrakhan awarded 2 home wins.
 FC Salyut Saratov awarded 1 home win.
 FC Sokol-d Saratov was not promoted as it was a reserves team of FC Sokol Saratov and reserve teams were not eligible for promotion. It played their first professional season and did not play in any national-level competitions in 1995.
 FC Zarya Krotovka moved to Samara and renamed to FC Yudzhin. Yudzhin did not play in any national-level competitions in 1995.
 FC Kristall Sergach and FC Metallurg Vyksa played their first professional seasons.
 FC Salyut Saratov and FC Neftyanik Pokhvistnevo promoted from the Amateur Football League.
 FC Khimik Uvarovo did not play in any national-level competitions in 1995.

Top goalscorers 
18 goals

 Dmitri Yemelyanov (FC SKD Samara)

15 goals

 Zurab Tsiklauri (FC SKD Samara)

14 goals

 Dmitri Borisko (FC SKD Samara)

13 goals

 Yuri Telyushov (FC Zenit Penza)
 Vyacheslav Ulitin (FC Zenit Penza)

12 goals

 Oleg Sofonov (FC Torpedo Pavlovo)
 Vadim Zhukovskiy (FC Yudzhin Samara)

11 goals

 Vladimir Anisimov (FC Khimik Dzerzhinsk)
 Oleg Gordeyev (FC Yudzhin Samara)
 Sergei Khokhlov (FC Salyut Saratov)
 Valeri Makarov (FC Tekstilshchik Isheyevka)

Zone 6

Overview

Standings

Notes:
 FC Sibir Kurgan and FC Gornyak Kachkanar awarded 1 home win each.
 FC KDS Samrau Ufa renamed to FC Estel.
 FC Uralmash-d Yekaterinburg played their first professional season.
 FC Trubnik Kamensk-Uralsky promoted from the Amateur Football League.
 FC Khimik Meleuz promoted from the Amateur Football League. Khimik did not play in any national-level competitions in 1995.
 FC KamAZavtotsentr Naberezhnye Chelny did not play in any national-level competitions in 1995.

Top goalscorers 
19 goals

 Vladimir Naydanov (FC Sibir Kurgan)

16 goals

 Eduard Rakhmangulov (FC Estel Ufa)

15 goals

 Albert Gubaydulin (FC Sodovik Sterlitamak)
 Vitali Lazin (FC Zenit Izhevsk)

14 goals

 Aleksandr Muzyka (FC Uralmash-d Yekaterinburg)
 Sergei Sviridkin (FC Gazovik Orenburg)
 Oleg Yeryomin (FC Estel Ufa)

13 goals

 Oleg Dudlya (FC Gornyak Kachkanar)

12 goals

 Vyacheslav Suspitsin (FC Gazovik Orenburg)

10 goals

 Oleg Vladimirov (FC Energiya Chaikovsky)

See also
1994 Russian Top League
1994 Russian First League
1994 Russian Second League

4
1994
Russia
Russia